Two referendum questions were placed on the statewide ballot in Maine for November 2, 2021. One is a citizen-initiated proposal, while the other is a proposed amendment to the Maine Constitution submitted by the Maine Legislature for ratification.

Limits on power line construction: This proposal seeks to stop the construction of the Hydro Québec's New England Clean Energy Connect (NECEC) power line between Quebec and Massachusetts by retroactively revoking its approval and banning such construction in the upper Kennebec River region. It also would require that the Legislature approve the construction of other power lines elsewhere in Maine, including by a 2/3 vote if such construction will occur on public land. The referendum question was approved about 59%-41%, with 92% of precincts reporting.

Food sovereignty amendment: This proposed constitutional amendment would declare that individuals have a "natural, inherent and unalienable right to grow, raise, harvest, produce and consume the food of their own choosing for their own nourishment, sustenance, bodily health and well-being". The question was also approved with a 60-40 margin.

References

2021 ballot measures
Maine ballot measures
Hydro-Québec